This is the chart of Italian music artists listed by estimated sales according to the most important Italian newspapers, national television channels and music magazines.
As the compilation of official data of sale of records in Italy it began to have departed only since 1995, thanks to the Federazione Industria Musicale Italiana, some corporate body of musical survey, as for instance Hit Parade Italy have tried to put order to the preceding respects furnished by Musica e dischi, TV Sorrisi e Canzoni, Ciao 2001, and Doxa. From 1990 to 1995 any corporate body has furnished official data or estime of sale of the singers.

Reliable sources of estimated sales are most important Italian newspapers and magazines, like Il Corriere della Sera, La Repubblica, Il Giornale, Il Messaggero, and national radio and TV channels, like Rai, Mediaset, MTV, and Radio Italia TV.

To date, national sources attest 145 Italian music artists have surpassed five million records sold, twelve of which have sold between 50 and 100 million copies and five of which have sold over 100 million records.

Artist by estimated sales

100 and more million estimated copies

50 million to 99 million estimated copies

20 million to 49 million estimated sales

5 million to 19 million estimated sales

Other artists with indefinite over 5 million estimated records sold

A
 Salvatore Adamo
 Al Bano
 Biagio Antonacci
 Renzo Arbore

B
 Aleandro Baldi
 Luca Barbarossa
 Alex Baroni
 Franco Battiato
 Marcella Bella
 Edoardo Bennato
 Pierangelo Bertoli
 Fred Bongusto
 Angelo Branduardi
 Alex Britti
 Fred Buscaglione

C
 Luca Carboni
 Renato Carosone
 Raffaella Carrà
 Enrico Caruso
 Caterina Caselli
 Riccardo Cocciante

D
 Tony Dallara
 Pino Daniele
 Fabrizio De André
 Francesco De Gregori
 Riccardo Del Turco
 Nicola Di Bari
 Dik Dik
 Pino Donaggio
 Johnny Dorelli

E
 Elisa
 Sergio Endrigo
 Equipe 84

F
 Nino Ferrer
 Nico Fidenco
 Piero Focaccia
 Jimmy Fontana
 Ivano Fossati

G
 Giorgio Gaber
 Rino Gaetano
 Peppino Gagliardi
 Gemelli Diversi
 Giuliano e i Notturni
 Loretta Goggi
 Wilma Goich
 Irene Grandi
 Ivan Graziani
 Gianluca Grignani
 Francesco Guccini

I
 I Cugini di Campagna
 Il Giardino dei Semplici

J
 J-Ax / Articolo 31
 Enzo Jannacci

L
 Gino Latilla
 Bruno Lauzi
 Fausto Leali
 Luciano Ligabue

M
 Mal
 Fiorella Mannoia
 Mia Martini
 Matia Bazar
 Mario Merola
 Michele
 Mietta
 Amedeo Minghi

N
 Nada
 New Trolls

O
 Anna Oxa

P
 Paola & Chiara
 Gino Paoli
 Gianni Pettenati
 Nilla Pizzi

R
 Raf
 Tony Renis
 Teddy Reno
 Renato Rascel
 Enrico Ruggeri

S
 Bobby Solo
 Alan Sorrenti
 Stadio

T
 The Rokes 
 Luigi Tenco
 Mario Tessuto

V
 Ornella Vanoni

Z
 Iva Zanicchi
 Michele Zarrillo

Other commercially and media successful artists

Successful artists from Italian talent shows

See also
List of best-selling music artists
List of best-selling Latin music artists
List of best-selling albums in Italy
List of best-selling singles
List of best-selling music artists in the United States
List of best-selling music artists in Finland
List of best-selling Swedish music artists
 Italian music awards

Notes
This list is not compiled by certified sales but by estimated sales.
Sales sources are the most reliable Italian newspapers, music magazines and national TV channels.

References

Italy
Italian music-related lists